McFaddin is an unincorporated community in Victoria County, Texas, United States. It is part of the Victoria, Texas Metropolitan Statistical Area.

The community was known as Marianna from 1906 to 1923. The population as of 2000 was 175.  In 1990 It was 300. It is seated on Farm to Market 445. It was named after James A. McFaddin, a Civil War veteran. It has three Texas Historical Commission plaques.

Geography
It is near the San Antonio River. It's 18 miles southwest of Victoria. A railroad runs through the town.

Education
McFaddin residents are zoned to the Victoria Independent School District.

External links
  Handbook of Texas Online article

References

Unincorporated communities in Texas
Unincorporated communities in Victoria County, Texas
Victoria, Texas metropolitan area